Pseudopanurgus is a genus of mining bees in the family Andrenidae. There are at least 130 described species in Pseudopanurgus. Pseudopanurgus bees often have 2 submarginal cells in their forewings. Their size range for extra-small to small, 3mm to 10mm

See also
 List of Pseudopanurgus species

References

Further reading

External links

 

Andrenidae
Bee genera
Articles created by Qbugbot